The 2012 Johnstown Generals season was the second season for the Ultimate Indoor Football League (UIFL) franchise.

On May 15, 2012, the Generals were suspended by the league due to a lack of funds.
The Generals were able to finish the season with a 2–6 record, and failed to qualify for the playoffs.

Schedule
Key:

Regular season

Standings

Final roster

References

Johnstown Generals
Johnstown Generals
Johnstown Generals